Markus Jiskra is a Swiss international taekwondo player. He reached the quarter-final of the 2008 European Championships in Rome, and competed in the 2008 Summer Olympics in Beijing.

References

Olympic taekwondo practitioners of Switzerland
Taekwondo practitioners at the 2008 Summer Olympics
Swiss male taekwondo practitioners
Living people
Year of birth missing (living people)